Pseudoclita is a genus of moths belonging to the subfamily Olethreutinae of the family Tortricidae.

Species
Pseudoclita prosantes Bradley, 1957

See also
List of Tortricidae genera

References

External links
tortricidae.com

Tortricidae genera
Olethreutinae